A special election was held on May 19, 1993 Ohio's 2nd congressional district following the resignation of Bill Gradison to become president of the Health Insurance Association of America. Future  United States Senator Rob Portman won this southern Ohio district overwhelmingly.

Primary results

Results

References

Ohio 1993 02
Ohio 1993 02
1993 02 Special
Ohio 02 Special
United States House of Representatives 02 Special
United States House of Representatives 1993 02